The Northeast Gainesville Residential District, also known locally as the Duck Pond, is a U.S. historic district (designated as such on February 12, 1980) located in Gainesville, Florida. It contains 229 historic buildings.

References

External links
 Florida's Office of Cultural and Historical Programs - Alachua County
 Historic Markers in Alachua County

Geography of Gainesville, Florida
National Register of Historic Places in Gainesville, Florida
Historic districts on the National Register of Historic Places in Florida
Geography of Alachua County, Florida
1980 establishments in Florida